Events from the year 1724 in Denmark.

Incumbents
 Monarch – Frederick IV
 Grand Chancellor – Ulrik Adolf Holstein

Events

 9 November – At the Greenland Parade, two Greenlandic Inuit, Pock and Keperock, who had been sent to Copenhagen by Hans Egede earlier that year, are presented to the general public when they sail through the canals around Christiansborg Palace in their kayaks accompanied by barges with musicians and dignitaries.

Undated
 * The Central Guardhouse on Kongens Nytorv in Copenhagen is built. In 1874 it is moved to Kastellet.
 Frederik Rostgaard is banished from the Royal Court in Copenhagen after accusations of corruption and withdraws to Krogerup Manor north of the city.
 The Faroe Islands detach from rule of Denmark.

Cilture

Art
 The Royal Greenland Trading Department charges Bernhard Grodtschilling with painting a double portrait of  Pooq and Qiperoq. It is the following year handed over to the Kunstkammeret.

Births
 15 June – Jens Krag-Juel-Vind, Supreme Court justice and landowner (died 1776) 
 22 August – Jens Schielderup Sneedorff, author, professor of political science and royal teacher (died 1764)

Deaths
 16 July – Jacob Coning, painter (born c. 1645)

References

 
1720s in Denmark
Denmark
Years of the 18th century in Denmark